An upcoming American experimental musical biopic concert film is being directed by Alex Ross Perry. It is a documentary/fiction hybrid film about the American indie band Pavement, incorporating scripted scenes with documentary footage of the band and a musical stage play consisting of songs from their discography.

Plot
Described as "a semiotic experiment", the film combines elements of documentary with a biopic of the band, and incorporates moments from Slanted! Enchanted! A Pavement Musical, a jukebox musical using Pavement's music. That play is about Essem, an aspiring Stephen Malkmus-like musician in a small town, who meets and falls in love with a woman named Anne, boards a train for New York City with her, is tempted by fame and glory, has an affair with another aspiring musician named Loretta, and wonders if love is worth it. The story loosely tracks the progression and themes of Pavements works, chronologically.

Production
Matador Records first approached Perry about creating a film with the band, except that frontman Stephen Malkmus wasn’t interested in hiring a documentary filmmaker, instead wanting to hire a screenwriter who would not write a screenplay. Inspired by the elliptical nature of that request, Perry conceived a version of the project that would defy explanation, comparing it to a film about Bob Dylan that combined D.A. Pennebaker’s Dont Look Back, Todd Haynes’ I'm Not There, Martin Scorsese's Rolling Thunder Revue and Dylan's own Renaldo and Clara.

The film's production encompassed the creation of "Pavements 1933-2022: A Pavement Museum", a touring museum exhibit composed of real and fake artifacts from the band's history.

The production of Slanted! Enchanted! signals the first foray into musical theater for Perry, who had previously worked with Pavement on a music video for their song Harness Your Hopes and aided in creating a Pavement Museum, which had a short pop-up installation in Manhattan in October 2023. Longtime Perry collaborator Craig Butta produced the play, enlisting Angela Trimbur to choreograph the musicals extensive and complex dance sequences along with co-choreographer Tenaya Kelleher.

Keegan Dewitt and Dabney Morris, film composers and previous collaborators with Alex Ross Perry worked on the arrangements, re-contextualizing the indie rock slacker songs into the big broadway musical parlance. Robert Kolodny, another Perry collaborator, created the on stage projections which play throughout the entirety of the performance. John Arnos created the set and Amanda Ford designed the costumes.

Michael Esper was cast in the lead of the show, with actor/director Zoe Lister-Jones and Kathryn Gallagher also appearing.

The New York off-Broadway production started previews on December 1, 2022 at the Sheen Center for Thought and Culture in Manhattan's NOHO neighborhood.

Cast
 Stephen Malkmus as himself
 Bob Nastanovich as himself
 Scott Kannberg as himself
 Steve West as himself
 Mark Ibold as himself
 Michael Esper as Essem
 Zoe Lister-Jones as Anne
 Kathryn Gallagher as Loretta

Lucy Benzinger, Brandi Campbell, John El-Jor, Tenaya Kelleher, Joe Laplant, Nicholas Lovalvo, and Sophie Morris appear as ensemble members in Slanted! Enchanted!

References

2022 musicals
American mockumentary films
American nonlinear narrative films
Concert films
Films based on musicals
Off-Broadway musicals
Rock musicals
Upcoming films
Rockumentaries